Diff-Quik is a commercial Romanowsky stain variant used to rapidly stain and differentiate a variety of pathology specimens. It is most frequently used for blood films and cytopathological smears, including fine needle aspirates. The Diff-Quik procedure is based on a modification of the Wright-Giemsa stain pioneered by Harleco in the 1970s, and has advantages over the routine Wright-Giemsa staining technique in that it reduces the 4-minute process into a much shorter operation and allows for selective increased eosinophilic or basophilic staining depending upon the time the smear is left in the staining solutions.

There are generic brands of such stain, and the trade name is sometimes used loosely to refer to any such stain (much as "Coke" or "Band-Aid" are sometimes used imprecisely).

Usage
Diff-Quik may be utilized on material which is air-dried prior to alcohol fixation rather than immersed immediately (i.e. "wet-fixed"), although immediate alcohol fixation results in improved microscopic detail. 

The primary use of Romanowsky-type stains in cytopathology is for cytoplasmic detail, while Papanicolaou stain is used for nuclear detail. Diff-Quik stain highlights cytoplasmic elements such as mucins, fat droplets and neurosecretory granules. Extracellular substances, such as free mucin, colloid, and ground substance, are also easily stained, and appear metachromatic. Major applications include blood smears, bone marrow aspirates, semen analysis and cytology of various body fluids including urine and cerebrospinal fluid. Microbiologic agents, such as bacteria and fungi, also appear more easily in Diff-Quik. This is useful for the detection of for example Helicobacter pylori from gastric and pyloric specimens.

Due to its short staining time, Diff-Quik stain is often used for initial screening of cytopathology specimens. This staining technique allows the cytotechnologist or pathologist to quickly assess the adequacy of the specimen, identify possible neoplastic or inflammatory changes, and decide whether or not additional staining is required.

Components 
The Diff-Quik stain consists of 3 solutions:
Diff-Quik fixative reagent
Triarylmethane dye
Methanol
Diff-Quik solution I (eosinophilic)
Xanthene dye (Eosin Y)
pH buffer
Diff-Quik solution II (basophilic thiazine dyes)
Methylene blue 
Azure A
pH buffer

Results

Alternatives 
Wright Giemsa stain
Papanicolaou stain

References 

Staining
Histopathology
Hematopathology
Cytopathology
Romanowsky stains